Bat-Orgil Gerelt-Od (born 23 January 2002) is a Mongolian footballer who plays as a defender for Mongolian Premier League club Ulaanbaatar and the Mongolian national team.

Club career
Gerelt-Od began his career with Deren FC. In January 2022 he joined FC Ulaanbaatar after his contract with Ulaanbaatar City had expired. He reportedly turned down higher offers to join the club.

International career
Gerelt-Od represented Mongolia at the youth level in 2018 AFC U-19 Championship qualification, 2020 AFC U-19 Championship qualification, 2020 AFC U-23 Championship qualification, and 2022 AFC U-23 Asian Cup qualification. In qualification for the 2018 AFC U-19 Championship he scored one goal against Thailand and assisted on Ganbold Ganbayar's goal against Singapore. 

Gerelt-Od made his senior international debut on 7 June 2021 in a 1–0 victory over Kyrgyzstan in 2022 FIFA World Cup qualification.

International statistics

References

External links

2002 births
Living people
Mongolian footballers
Association football defenders
Mongolia international footballers
Ulaanbaatar City FC players
FC Ulaanbaatar players
Deren FC players
Mongolian National Premier League players